Rowena Cole (born 13 January 1992) is a British middle-distance runner who specialises in the 800 metres and competes in international level events. Her highest achievement in winning is a silver medal won at the 2011 European Athletics Junior Championships in Tallinn.

References

1992 births
Living people
Sportspeople from Coventry
British female middle-distance runners